Resident Evil Outbreak: File #2 is a survival horror video game and is a sequel to Resident Evil Outbreak and the final installment of the spinoff game series. It was released for the PlayStation 2 in Japan on September 9, 2004, North America on April 26, 2005, and Europe on August 26, 2005.

Following the success of Outbreak in Japan, Capcom announced File #2 in late 2004. The same eight characters from the first title return with similar abilities, and the game once again takes place in a zombie-inhabited Raccoon City. Five new scenarios are available, the first four being playable from the beginning. In pre-ordered editions in Japan, the game was packaged with a demo of Devil May Cry 3.

On January 1, 2014, the servers were opened back up to the public using alternate fan servers, thus, once again allowing for online play, along with new additions to the server such as banlists and leaderboards.

Gameplay

Scenarios 
The player selects a scenario, difficulty level, and a character. Each difficulty level is associated with enemies and items the player encounters as they progress through the scenario. The game has five scenarios: "Wild Things", "Underbelly", "Flashback", "Desperate Times" and "End of the Road".

Each scenario has an event checklist consisting of special actions that the player must perform to reach 100% completion. Upon doing so the player will unlock "Infinity Mode" in which all the player's weapons never break or run out of ammunition.

Each scenario also has "SP" items. These are invisible items hidden throughout the level, and are randomly generated on two paths. There are twenty scenario items for each scenario, and twenty items specific to each character hidden across the five scenarios. If acquired, these items unlock new costumes and the option to listen to character ad-libs. The game comes with two bonus scenarios, "Elimination" and "Showdown"; both are designed as training guides to boost gameplay.

Controls 
Rather than using USB headphones or a computer keyboard, players use a command "ad-lib" system which consists of ten key command phrases, utilized by manipulating the right analog stick on the PlayStation 2 controller and a context-sensitive button. The player can select and request items from their teammate's inventory, or ask the teammate themselves to use the item in question. The new additions included the ad-lib phrase "Sorry", and context-related comments on the Map and File screens.

The sequel also boasted a new difficulty feature  and some changes to the game balance. These included a new "Nightmare Mode" and several alterations to previous damage charts. The game also added the ability to move the player's character while in attack stance, allowing a character with a gun to move and shoot at the same time.

Regional differences 
For the North American version of the game, the 'ad-libs' from the first game were removed. Subsequently, only when a character used the analog stick or made a request did they make a noise. If an ad-lib was attempted, no sounds were made, negatively affecting gameplay. If a player attempts to tell another that they are poisoned, the chances the message would be noticed are low if they are in the middle of combat. The Japanese release features full voices, while the European version features voices, but without text.

The Japanese version features Japanese subtitles for the cutscenes while the characters retain the use of English, as with previous Biohazard titles. Because of the character variety, this leads to a strange continuation where the Japanese subtitles read as having all the characters saying the same thing in some situations.

The minor character, "Linda", is called "Rinda" in the Japanese version. In Japan, the game ran on the KDDI MMBB service. In the United States, this service was swapped out for the Sega Network Application Package. Because of this change, several features were removed from the NTSC/PAL versions, including private messaging, advanced search options, and special options to limit the rankings to find specific ranks.

Multiplayer mode 
On March 31, 2007, Capcom closed their PAL and NTSC servers for File #2. Online play was given a major overhaul from that of the previous game. File #2 had a new lobby system, new event system, and an increase in options and modes of play.

Capcom ran events from April to late May of 2005 that were sponsored by various gaming magazines. This included events from PlayStation Magazine and Electronic Gaming Monthly, amongst others. Clearing these events rewarded the players with characters and costumes. Some events took place in standard levels on set difficulties, while others placed the player in selected levels with Infinite and Nightmare options activated before the two options were available for free use. After all sponsored events ended, Capcom ran two events in circulation, a point bonus event and an SP item hunt.

The lobby system was revamped to include ten areas with different options in each one; however, this change made it harder to join games with friends. In order for a player to join a friend in their hosted or current game the player needed to enter a menu to search for their name, then exit that menu, choose the area they are in, and find the game. This menu did not mention the number of players in the game when searched for, meaning a game could be full before the player joined.

In early July, Capcom closed an alternate server, leaving only one choice for the player when they connected. Months after, Nightmare Mode, Infinite Mode, and changes to the Area system were made. HDD Support was dropped from the Area Screen, but players could still host games with HDD mode turned on by activating it offline.

From within the game, or by a link on the official Capcom sales page of their United States site, players could look and see their position on the ranking boards.

Plot 
File #2 is a continuation of the events that occur in the original Outbreak, though the exact order of the scenarios is left ambiguous. Though there is no concrete "start" to the game, it ends with the execution of Mission Code: XX in which the government effectively nukes all of Raccoon City to eradicate the threat posed by the T-virus.

The first scenario listed is "Wild Things," in which Cindy Lennox leads the rest of the survivors to the Raccoon City Zoo in hopes of reaching a rescue helicopter on the other side of the zoo. Throughout the scenario, players are pursued by an array of animals infected by the virus, the most dangerous being the zombie elephant Oscar, who follows the players from area to area until he is either locked in the Elephant Stage or killed by the players. Should they reach the Front Plaza without killing him or locking him away, he will appear as the boss; otherwise, the zombie lion Max will be the boss. Once the players reach the end of the stage and board the tram, the tram stops, and the rescue helicopter is shown on fire in the distance, with the pilot dying of his injuries outside of the burning helicopter.

The second scenario, "Underbelly," follows the players' journey into a subway station and attempt to escape the city using a subway train. Before they can leave, however, another moving train runs into a pile of debris and explodes, awakening the "Giga Bite," an enormous flea, who the players later fight at the end of the stage. To initiate this fight, one of the players is kidnapped by the Giga Bite while waiting for their train to depart. After defeating the boss, if the players do not make it back to the train in time, they must find an alternate way out through the Substation Tower, which is through the ventilation shaft.

In the third scenario, "Flashback," Alyssa Ashcroft leads the survivors to a cabin in the woods where they are met by Albert Lester (Also known as Al), who promises to lead them to a neighboring town. He mysteriously disappears once the players reach a bridge leading to an abandoned hospital. There are two different paths where it depends on the gameplay;

 When the bridge breaks only in fifteen minutes, the player did not make it to the hospital without Lester, leaving the mystery of the hospital behind and allows to turn back to the remaining cabin where the player meets an injured woman named Regan, explains that her daughter Lucy is lost somewhere in the woods. Regan allows to gives Lucy's Pendant to the player, which she says will make Lucy more willing to trust you. When you approaches to the woods, each enemies and paths were changed. If the player saves Lucy who found on the shore, they will give you a reward. However, Regan told the player there is another suspension bridge that leads to the outside of the woods.
 When the players approaches to the bridge that leads to the hospital, she allows to investigate, unless, a masked ax-wielding man chases them throughout the scenario. Players must kill sections of a giant plant that has overtaken the hospital building by injecting it with a serum-filled syringe. The final boss is the core of the plant, which is later found out to be controlled by an infected Dorothy, Al's wife, who was experimented on in the hospital. Al is shown in the ending to have been leading people to the hospital to kill them in order to feed his wife in her plant form. If the player plays through the level as Alyssa, they will experience several flashbacks at different points in the scenario, as Alyssa and a friend who died at the hands of a zombified Dorothy once investigated the hospital's ethics years ago. The player could also get different endings depending on how many files the player collected in the hospital.

In the fourth scenario, "Desperate Times," finds the players in the Raccoon City Police Department defending themselves from zombies that have crowded outside of the station. By finding several plates, the players open a secret passage for one of the cops, Rita, to navigate and find help. Before she can return, the zombies break through the gates of the police department, and the players must defeat a certain amount (depending on which difficulty they chose) of them before completing the scenario. The players are forced to leave policeman Marvin behind as they drive away, while he locks himself in the room in which Claire or Leon (depending on whom the player chooses to be) finds him severely wounded in Resident Evil 2.

In the final scenario, "End of the Road," David King leads the survivors to an Umbrella laboratory, where they are met by two scientists, Linda and Carter, who have returned to get the cure. Before they can leave, an alarm sounds, and a shutter closes the exit, which the scientists are unable to open. The lab is infested with hunters, which Carter fends off by awakening the Tyrant to fight for him. As the group is about to exit, however, the Tyrant turns on the players, killing Carter and throwing Linda from a ledge. The Tyrant then follows the players for the rest of the scenario. The players enter the sewers below the lab, where they find Linda alive. Depending on if the player whether or not killed the Tyrant, they are either washed away in the sewers with Linda or left behind to reach the upper levels themselves. Regardless, the players encounter a mutated Tyrant on the city streets. Players are given a chance to rescue Linda, who is shot by a sniper (who also shoots at the players), and must be carried by the player to the end of the stage. They can choose to escape by truck but must fight Nyx, the final boss, before doing so, or by helicopter, without fighting a final boss. Also, in the final scenario, there are four different endings. 

 "Up and Away with Linda" is obtained by escaping the city by helicopter with Linda in possession.
 "Up and Away" is obtained by escaping the city by helicopter, but letting Linda die on the way or not finding her.
 "Run Like the Linda" is obtained by escaping the city by truck with Linda in possession.
 "Run Like the Wind" is obtained by escaping the city by truck, but letting Linda die on the way or not finding her.

Obtaining the first or the third ending grants the player the Good ending and epilogue for the character chosen, and obtaining the second or the fourth ending will grant the player the Bad ending.

Development and release 

The game was developed by Capcom Production Studio 1 over a one-year period. Although graphics did not differ greatly from its predecessor, elements of gameplay and online features were overhauled. For example one of the biggest changes over the first game was that players had the ability to select their own AIPCs. Originally this was not allowed, with the two characters being set based on scenario and player character (for example, Kevin always had Mark and Cindy in "Outbreak", and Yoko and David in "Decisions, Decisions").

While most of Europe had access to a server, unlike the previous release, certain countries still had their versions edited to not allow it as servers in their language were not secured. As a 100% completion required the player to do certain things each level that could only be done online, these versions had those goals removed.

The five scenarios chosen were "Wild Things", "Underbelly", "Flashback", "Desperate Times" and "End of the Road". Unlike the scenarios released in Outbreak, those released in File #2 took considerable use of story branching, allowing players to get different endings based on gameplay. In the case of "Underbelly", the player could fail to reach a departing subway train and leave the station via a ventilation shaft. In the case of "Flashback", different endings were reached based on whether or not the player collected certain files in the hospital, and they could even end the scenario without ever reaching it.

On September 22, with File #2 more than a week into its release, it reached news sites that Capcom was falling into financial difficulties in its stock, with Media Create citing 91,000 sold copies of the game in Japan so far, much less than Capcom's hopes. The ability to strafe and shoot simultaneously was added. Load times were also improved. The game was released on September 9, 2004, in Japan and on April 26, 2005, in North America.

Reception 

Resident Evil Outbreak: File #2 has been met with mixed reviews: Metacritic gave it a 58/100 and GameRankings gave it a 62.92%. A third game was planned for release (as data was found within the game's disc hinting as such) but was ultimately scrapped due to low sales of this game.

Notes

References

External links 
 

2004 video games
Cooperative video games
Interquel video games
Multiplayer and single-player video games
PlayStation 2 games
PlayStation 2-only games
Survival video games
Video game prequels
Video game sequels
Video games about police officers
Video games developed in Japan
Video games featuring female protagonists
Video games scored by Tetsuya Shibata
Video games set in the United States
Video games set in 1998
Video games with pre-rendered 3D graphics
Resident Evil spin-off games
2000s horror video games